The St. Volodymyr Museum is a museum in Winnipeg, Manitoba, Canada. It was started in Canada's centennial year by the Ukrainian Catholic Women's League of Canada. The museum collects, preserves, interprets and exhibits Ukrainian Catholic material.

The museum is located at 233 Scotia Street.

Affiliations
The Museum is affiliated with: CMA,  CHIN, and Virtual Museum of Canada.

References

Museums in Winnipeg
Religious museums in Canada
Ukrainian Catholic Church in Canada
Museums established in 1967
Ukrainian-Canadian culture in Manitoba
Ukrainian museums in Canada
20th-century religious buildings and structures in Canada